Ernest Zongo (born 1 January 1964 in Ouahigouya) is a retired Burkinabé cyclist.

Major results
1993
2nd Tour du Faso
1995
1st Tour du Faso
1997
1st Tour du Faso

References

1964 births
Living people
Burkinabé male cyclists
21st-century Burkinabé people